Badralensa Khanum (19th-century) was a consort of shah Fath-Ali Shah Qajar of Persia (r. 1797–1834).

She was a niece of Agha Mohammad Khan Qajar. She was one of the most influential women of the Qajar harem during the reign of Fath-Ali Shah Qajar. She was known for her conflict with Asieh Khanam Dolo.

References

 

19th-century births
19th-century deaths
19th-century Iranian women
Qajar royal consorts